The Quebec City Tramway is a proposed light rail system. A former streetcar system existed in the city between 1897 and 1948.

First tramway (1865 to 1948)

Horsecars 

In fall 1863, a group of local businessmen and public figures from Quebec City presented a petition at the Parliament of the Province of Canada for the incorporation of a streetcar company. Among them were Pierre Garneau and John Lemesurier, future mayors of Quebec City, entrepreneurs Guillaume-Eugène Chinic and Cérice Têtu and many others. The group was incorporated under the name Quebec Street Railway Company. (QSRC) on October 15, 1863. It obtained the right to build a system for the city five neighbourhoods. Nevertheless, it was mainly the commercial and port sector of the Lower Town that interested the company. First, they established a horse-drawn omnibus between Champlain Market and St. Ours Street barrier. Wooden rails were embedded in the roadway in this corridor to create the first horsecar line. The service started on August 18, 1865. The arrival of streetcars disrupted centuries-old practices: a ticket cost 5 cents while a horse-drawn carriage varied between 25 and 50 cents. Coach drivers denounced unfair competition and some vehicles were vandalized, rails removed and drivers brutalized. Also, the city and the company were sometimes inconsistent, regarding for instance who was responsible for road maintenance. Moreover, for financial reasons, the company refused to expand its network to the Upper Town, which would also have benefited from public transport. In 1874, the QSRC proceeded to an extension toward Saint-Sauveur, which was not part of the city at the time, to build its depot and avoid paying taxes to the municipality.

Streecars appeared in the Upper Town from 1878 onwards with the creation of a second company, the St. John Street Railway Company Ltd. It built a line linking the Château Frontenac to De Salaberry Avenue through St. John Street. Stables were situated at the intersection with Philippe-Dorval Street.

City electric trams

Electrification and networking 

The desire to create a real electrified city system was felt throughout 1890s, especially with the arrival of the electric streetcars in Montreal in 1892. The Quebec, Montmorency and Charlevoix Railway Company and its president, businessman and engineer Horace Jansen Beemer, got an exclusive franchise from the Quebec City Council to this end. They created the Quebec District Railway Company, a subsidiary responsible for managing the city streetcar system. This branch purchased two existing tram companies. Major works were needed: the Montmorency Electric Power Company had to modernize its facilities to provide the new energy demand from the electric network, a metal structure was essential for tram traffic between the Upper and Lower town with a very smooth slope, St. Jean's Gate was demolished to improve traffic flow with Old Quebec, etc. In the summer of 1897, the four lines of this united and electrified public transport system were opened. Côte Dinan trestle, connecting St. Paul Street to the Hôtel-Dieu de Québec, received its first trams in December. From then on, trams would be pulled by horses only when they broke down.

New streetcars built in New York could accommodate 25 to 27 passengers up to 50 people and are equipped with heaters. This new public transport participated in the rapid expansion of the city toward Ville-Montcalm, which was growing in population and confirming its residential character.

Expansion, apogee and decline 

In 1899, railway and power companies merged to form the powerful Quebec Railway Light & Power Company, a trust in the power and transport sectors for the whole Quebec City area. This company, later known under the name Quebec Power, would run the tramway until its closure in 1948.

In 1910, the network was expanded to Sillery and in 1912, to Beauport. The tramway was at its peak and covered almost the entire city. In 1932, the network stretched from Sillery to Montmorency. At the time, 11 lines in total were in service.

From 1937 onwards, buses' popularity was increasing and caused the disappearance of the trams. On May 26, 1948, the last line serving Saint-Sauveur was permanently closed.

Proposal

History 
 2000: The Ministère des Transports du Québec gives the RTC the mandate to carry out an opportunity and feasibility study for the insertion of a tramway along the Metrobus routes.
 2003: The study recommends the construction of a tramway network in the city.
 2005: The City adds the tramway to its 2005-2025 Master Development Plan.
 2010: The City committee for sustainable transport submit a report. It recommends to build a tramway line by 2030.
 2015: Second feasibility study. The City chooses bus rapid transit instead of tramway.
 2017: Six weeks after municipal elections, the reelected mayor (Régis Labeaume) goes back to a tramway concept.

2003: First attempt 

In 2003, the Réseau de transport de la Capitale publishes an opportunity and feasibility study on a light rail system following a government request in 2000. The study shows that a tramway system could be positive for the city. The initially presented project proposes to insert the tram along the existing 800 and 801 Metrobus axes. Those routes pass through high-population-density sectors. The service frequency would be 5 to 10 minutes.

2010: Project presented by the City Committee for sustainable transport 

On June 10, 2010, the City Committee for sustainable transport recommended to build two tramway lines for $1.5 billion. Starting on the Saint Lawrence south shore, trams would cross the Quebec Bridge, then run along Laurier Boulevard, going through the Laval University campus, down Côte Nérée-Tremblay, along Charest Boulevard to the Quebec Courthouse. From there, they would go north, taking Capucins Boulevard and Chemin de la Canardière to finally end in the future D'Estimauville Ecodistrict. The second line would separate from the first line in Saint-Roch neighbourhood to service Quebec Parliament Hill with a final stop near the Grand Théâtre de Québec. It would pass through Pointe-aux-Lièvres, ExpoCité to Galeries Charlesbourg. A possible extension would be in the Upper town in the direction of Sainte-Foy.

This project was finally abandoned in 2015 in favour of bus rapid transit (SRB). The bus project was in turn cancelled in April 2017 following the withdrawal of the Lévis municipal authorities.

2018: Structure-enhancing public transit network 

In December 2017, a few weeks after the November municipal elections, reelected Mayor Régis Labeaume said his election promise for a new transport system would after all take the form of a light rail system. The current political context enables a great investment from provincial and federal governments in public transit, unlike the 2010 project.

In March 2018, the City, along with the Government of Quebec, announced the construction of a -long tramway line for $3 billion. The line will link Charlesbourg to Cap-Rouge, passing through Quebec Parliament Hill. There will be a  tunnel in this part. The service frequency will be 3 to 5 minutes in peak periods, 10 to 15 minutes during the day and weekend. Passenger capacity will be 260 per tram. The Quebec City tramway should be in service in 2026.

2020: Reassessment of tramway project 
In November 2020, Quebec's environmental review board (BAPE, part of the Ministry of Sustainable Development, Environment, and Fight Against Climate Change) has turned down Quebec City's $3.3-billion tramway project proposal. In the report, BAPE stated that planners should have also considered a subway or light rail system, rather than a tramway. The BAPE also states that the existing tramway proposal does not do enough to serve the city's suburbs, which are rapidly growing. Furthermore, BAPE questioned whether a tramway system could cope with the city's winter weather or how it would be integrated into the landscape. Quebec's Transport Minister, François Bonnardel, announced that the government was withdrawing the support for Quebec City's proposed tramway network, which he said will not go ahead unless it is reconfigured to better serve the suburbs. 

As of March 18, 2021, an agreement was reached to move the tramway project forward. However, the opposition party in Quebec, Quebec 21, proposed a light metro in place of a tramway revival in June 2021.

See also 

 Streetcars in Montreal
 Réseau de transport de la Capitale

References

External links 
 Official Website (in French)

Transport in Quebec City
Street railways in Quebec